Carl Ewald (15 October 185623 February 1908) was a Danish novelist and satirist known for his fairy tales.

Biography
Carl Ewald was born on 15 October 1856 in Bredelykke by Gram in the Duchy of Schleswig (present-day Denmark). He was named after  and he had twelve siblings. His father,  was an author. He was educated at the University of Copenhagen, where his family had moved to after the Duchy of Schleswig fell to the German Confederation in 1864. From 1880 to 1883 he was a school director in Copenhagen. His first literary work was published in 1882. After spending a few years as a forester, he turned to literature in 1887, issuing school texts and translations.

In 1893 he had a son, Jesper Ewald, with Betty Ponsaing. In 1894, due to an extramarital relationship he had with Agnes Henningsen, Ewald's second son Poul was born. The relationship ended in a divorce.

Ewald died in Charlottenlund (near Copenhagen) on 23 February 1908. He was buried in Gentofte.

Works
 Singleton's Udenlandsrejse (1894)
 Glaede over Danmark (1898)
 Sulasmiths Have (1898)
 Der Kinderkreuzzug (The Children's Crusade, 1896)
 Mein Kleiner Junge (My little boy, 1899)
 Crumlin (1900)
Several of his works have been translated into English.

References

External links
 
 
 
 
 

1856 births
1908 deaths
University of Copenhagen alumni
Danish male novelists
19th-century Danish novelists
19th-century male writers